Hillaryland was the self-designated name of a group of core advisors to Hillary Clinton, when she was First Lady of the United States and again when, as United States Senator, she was one of the Democratic Party candidates for President in the 2008 U.S. election.

The group included Huma Abedin, Patti Solis Doyle (credited with coining the name "Hillaryland"), Mandy Grunwald, Neel Lattimore, Ann Lewis, Evelyn Lieberman, Tamera Luzzatto, Capricia Marshall, Cheryl Mills, Minyon Moore, Lissa Muscatine, Neera Tanden, Melanne Verveer, Lisa Caputo, Ann Stock and Maggie Williams. In her autobiography, Living History, Clinton credits campaign aide Steve Rabinowitz with first using the term.

Almost all are women; the only man in the group was former First Lady deputy press secretary Neel Lattimore. Most worked in the Clinton Administration, and have been personal friends and confidants of Hillary Clinton since at least then, if not earlier. The name Hillaryland dates back to the Bill Clinton's 1992 presidential campaign, when it was the portion of his Little Rock, Arkansas "war room" that housed Hillary Clinton's staff.  Later it became better known as the moniker for the area of the West Wing of the White House in which the First Lady's staff had their offices; according to Clinton, Hillaryland had its own subculture, based on camaraderie, never leaking information to the press, and having plenty of toys and cookies around for the children of staffers – as Hillary put it, "While the West Wing had a tendency to leak... Hillaryland never did, and every child who ever visited knew exactly where we stashed the cookies." Clinton biographers Jeff Gerth and Don Van Natta, Jr. described Hillaryland as "an important subculture during the Clinton presidency."

The advisers were also present during Clinton's tenure as U.S. Senator.  But the role of Hillaryland came under considerable discussion during and after Clinton's 2008 presidential campaign that she conducted while senator. Michelle Cottle of New York magazine described its role as "less a campaign entity than an extended sisterhood defined by its devotion to its namesake. Even so, the group's protective ethos dominates her presidential campaign, where loyalty is demanded, self-promotion frowned upon, and talking out of school, especially to the press, [is strongly discouraged]."  As campaign chroniclers John Heilemann and Mark Halperin later wrote, "the people comprising it ... were loyal to a fault, smart and ruthless, hard-headed and hardboiled. ... They referred to themselves collectively as Hillaryland, and everyone else in politics did too."  By this point the definition of Hillaryland was often expanded a bit to include campaign insiders such as chief strategist Mark Penn.

After she ended up losing the 2008 Democratic nomination, critics often focused on the limited and isolated circle of advisers and dysfunctional management style as one of the reasons behind the campaign's failure. One criticism was that she valued personal loyalty over the ability to do the job. The level of protection and the consequent inability to criticize failed tactics—and the public perception that Clinton needed that much protection—alarmed critics in 2015 as well, prior to her loss in the general election the following year.

At the beginning of Clinton's 2009–13 tenure as U.S. Secretary of State, she brought over some of the Hillaryland personnel to staff the State Department, but she also hired other people as well.

Gallery

See also 
 Black Cabinet
 Kitchen Cabinet
 Medicine Ball Cabinet
 The War Room

References 

Hillary Clinton
Presidency of Bill Clinton
Hillary Clinton 2008 presidential campaign
American political consultants
American women in politics